Ryuta Sakurai (born September 8, 1971) is a Japanese mixed martial artist who currently competes in the middleweight division. A veteran who fought for many companies such as Shooto, Pancrase and PRIDE. 
Nicknamed Mr. DEEP, he is best known for spending most of his fighting career in DEEP, where he is a former DEEP Middleweight champion.

Career

DEEP
Sakurai defeated Ryuki Ueyama at Deep: 17 Impact on December 18th, 2004 by technical knockout in the first round to win the championship. Sakurai would lose the title in February 2006 to Ryo Chonan at Deep: 23rd Impact in the first round due to a cut. He would challenge for the championship in a rematch against rival Riki Fukuda at Deep: 40 Impact, where he lost via unanimous decision.

His last fight in DEEP to date was at Deep: 87 Impact on December 21st, 2018, to a second round submission loss to Tatsuya Mizuno.

Championship and accomplishments
DEEP
DEEP Middleweight Championship (1 time)

GRACHAN
GRAND Welterweight Championship (1 time)

Shooto
5th All Japan Amateur Shooto Light Heavyweight Championship tournament winner (1998)

Mixed martial arts record

|-
| Loss
| align=center| 28-27-6
| Hidetaka Arato
| Technical Decision (unanimous)
| GRACHAN 58
| 
| align=center| 2
| align=center| 4:48
| Chiba, Japan
| 
|-
| Win
| align=center| 28-26-6
| Radek Hecl
| TKO (punches)
| GRACHAN 57
| 
| align=center| 2
| align=center| 0:34
| Chiba, Japan
| 
|-
| Loss
| align=center| 27-26-6
| Hiroki Nagaoka
| Decision (unanimous)
| GRACHAN 48
| 
| align=center| 3
| align=center| 5:00
| Ota, Japan
| 
|-
| Win
| align=center| 27-25-6
| Daryl Lokoku
| Submission (armbar)
| GRACHAN 42 x GLADIATOR 011
| 
| align=center| 2
| align=center| 2:56
| Ota, Japan
| 
|-
| Win
| align=center| 26-25-6
| Akihito Mamiya
| Decision (unanimous)
| BRAVE FIGHT 18 x GRACHAN 39
| 
| align=center| 2
| align=center| 2:53
| Ota, Japan
| 
|-
| Loss
| align=center| 25-25-6
| Tatsuya Mizuno
| Submission (rear naked choke)
| Deep 87 Impact
| 
| align=center| 2
| align=center| 2:53
| Tokyo, Japan
|
|-
| Win
| align=center| 25-24-6
| Hikaru Sato
| TKO (punches)
| Pancrase 289
| 
| align=center| 2
| align=center| 0:23
| Tokyo, Japan
| 
|-
| Loss
| align=center| 24-24-6
| Yoichiro Sato
| Submission (guillotine choke)
| Deep: 78 Impact 
| 
| align=center| 2
| align=center| 1:22
| Tokyo, Japan
|
|-
| Loss
| align=center| 24-23-6
| Taisuke Okuno
| Decision (split)
| Deep: Cage Impact 2016
| 
| align=center| 3
| align=center| 5:00
| Tokyo, Japan
|
|-
| Loss
| align=center| 24-22-6
| Yushin Okami
| TKO (corner stoppage)
| Deep: 75 Impact
| 
| align=center| 2
| align=center| 4:23
| Tokyo, Japan
| 
|-
| Loss
| align=center| 24-21-6
| Svetlozar Savov
| Submission (guillotine choke)
| Abu Dhabi Warriors 2
| 
| align=center| 1
| align=center| 4:20
| Abu Dhabi, United Arab Emirates
|
|-
| Loss
| align=center| 24-20-6
| Ken Hasegawa
| Submission (keylock)
| Deep: 71 Impact
| 
| align=center| 1
| align=center| 4:10
| Tokyo, Japan
|
|-
| Loss
| align=center| 24-19-6
| Yoshiyuki Nakanishi
| Decision (unanimous)
| Deep: 69 Impact
| 
| align=center| 3
| align=center| 5:00
| Tokyo, Japan
| 
|-
| Loss
| align=center| 24-18-6
| Mamed Khalidov
| Submission (triangle choke)
| KSW 25: Khalidov vs. Sakurai 2
| 
| align=center| 1
| align=center| 2:03
| Wroclaw, Poland
| 
|-
| Win
| align=center| 24-17-6
| Yuji Sakuragi
| KO (punch and flying knee)
| Deep: Cage Impact 2013
| 
| align=center| 1
| align=center| 1:04
| Tokyo, Japan
| 
|-
| Win
| align=center| 23-17-6
| Hiromitsu Kanehara
| Submission (arm-triangle choke)
| Deep: Haleo Impact
| 
| align=center| 3
| align=center| 0:46
| Tokyo, Japan
| 
|-
| Loss
| align=center| 22-17-6
| Kazuhiro Nakamura
| Decision (majority)
| Deep: 60 Impact
| 
| align=center| 3
| align=center| 5:00
| Tokyo, Japan
| 
|-
| Win
| align=center| 22-16-6
| Katsuyori Shibata
| TKO (punches)
| Deep: 55 Impact
| 
| align=center| 2
| align=center| 3:04
| Tokyo, Japan
| 
|-
| Win
| align=center| 21-16-6
| Yoshiyuki Nakanishi
| Submission (armbar)
| Deep: 52 Impact
| 
| align=center| 3
| align=center| 3:48
| Tokyo, Japan
| 
|-
| Loss
| align=center| 20-16-6
| Riki Fukuda
| TKO (knees)
| Deep: 49 Impact
| 
| align=center| 2
| align=center| 0:32
| Tokyo, Japan
| 
|-
| Draw
| align=center| 20-15-6
| Mamed Khalidov
| Draw (unanimous)
| KSW 13: Kumite
| 
| align=center| 4
| align=center| 3:00
| Katowice, Poland
| 
|-
| Win
| align=center| 20-15-5
| Hiroki Sato
| KO (punch)
| Deep: Cage Impact 2009
| 
| align=center| 1
| align=center| 2:13
| Tokyo, Japan
| 
|-
| Win
| align=center| 19-15-5
| Hosea Ware
| Submission (straight armbar)
| Deep: 44 Impact
| 
| align=center| 1
| align=center| 3:46
| Tokyo, Japan
| 
|-
| Draw
| align=center| 18-15-5
| Hiromitsu Kanehara
| Draw (majority)
| Deep: 42 Impact
| 
| align=center| 2
| align=center| 5:00
| Tokyo, Japan
| 
|-
| Loss
| align=center| 18-15-4
| Riki Fukuda
| TKO (punches)
| Deep: 40 Impact
| 
| align=center| 1
| align=center| 0:45
| Tokyo, Japan
| 
|-
| Win
| align=center| 18-14-4
| Sojiro Orui
| Decision (split)
| Deep: 38 Impact
| 
| align=center| 2
| align=center| 5:00
| Tokyo, Japan
| 
|-
| Win
| align=center| 17-14-4
| Kozo Urita
| Submission (armbar)
| Deep: 37 Impact
| 
| align=center| 1
| align=center| 3:22
| Tokyo, Japan
| 
|-
| Win
| align=center| 16-14-4
| Young Choi
| Decision (unanimous)
| Deep: 35 Impact
| 
| align=center| 2
| align=center| 5:00
| Tokyo, Japan
| 
|-
| Loss
| align=center| 15-14-4
| Riki Fukuda
| Decision (unanimous)
| Deep: 34 Impact
| 
| align=center| 3
| align=center| 5:00
| Tokyo, Japan
| 
|-
| Win
| align=center| 15-13-4
| Eiji Ishikawa
| TKO (cut)
| Deep: 32 Impact
| 
| align=center| 1
| align=center| 5:00
| Tokyo, Japan
| 
|-
| Loss
| align=center| 14-13-4
| Murilo Bustamante
| KO (punch)
| Deep: 29 Impact
| 
| align=center| 1
| align=center| 3:50
| Tokyo, Japan
| 
|-
| Loss
| align=center| 14-12-4
| Ryo Chonan
| Decision (majority)
| Deep: 28 Impact
| 
| align=center| 3
| align=center| 5:00
| Tokyo, Japan
| 
|-
| Win
| align=center| 14-11-4
| Geovani Pereira
| Submission (kimura)
| Deep: 27 Impact
| 
| align=center| 1
| align=center| 0:57
| Tokyo, Japan
| 
|-
| Win
| align=center| 13-11-4
| Xavier Foupa-Pokam
| Technical Submission (armbar)
| Deep: 25 Impact
| 
| align=center| 1
| align=center| 4:47
| Tokyo, Japan
| 
|-
| Loss
| align=center| 12-11-4
| Ryo Chonan
| TKO (cut)
| Deep: 23 Impact
| 
| align=center| 1
| align=center| 1:57
| Tokyo, Japan
| 
|-
| Loss
| align=center| 12-10-4
| Paulo Filho
| Submission (armbar)
| Pride: Bushido 9
| 
| align=center| 1
| align=center| 3:49
| Tokyo, Japan
| 
|-
| Win
| align=center| 12-9-4
| Yasuhito Namekawa
| Submission (armbar)
| Deep: 19th Impact
| 
| align=center| 1
| align=center| 4:40
| Tokyo, Japan
| 
|-
| Loss
| align=center| 11-9-4
| Murilo Bustamante
| Decision (unanimous)
| Pride: Bushido 6
| 
| align=center| 2
| align=center| 5:00
| Yokohama, Japan
| 
|-
| Win
| align=center| 11-8-4
| Ryuki Ueyama
| TKO (punches)
| Deep: 17th Impact
| 
| align=center| 1
| align=center| 2:40
| Tokyo
| 
|-
| Win
| align=center| 10-8-4
| David Bielkheden
| Decision (unanimous)
| Shooto: 7/16 in Korakuen Hall
| 
| align=center| 3
| align=center| 5:00
| Tokyo, Japan
| 
|-
| Loss
| align=center| 9-8-4
| Yushin Okami
| Decision (unanimous)
| Pride: Bushido 2
| 
| align=center| 2
| align=center| 5:00
| Yokohama, Japan
| 
|-
| Win
| align=center| 9-7-4
| Tetsuya Onose
| KO (punches)
| Deep: 13th Impact
| 
| align=center| 1
| align=center| 0:56
| Tokyo
| 
|-
| Win
| align=center| 8-7-4
| Hirohide Fujinuma
| Submission (kimura)
| Deep: 12th Impact
| 
| align=center| 1
| align=center| 3:46
| Tokyo, Japan
| 
|-
| Loss
| align=center| 7-7-4
| Eiji Ishikawa
| TKO (punches)
| Deep: 9th Impact
| 
| align=center| 2
| align=center| 4:22
| Tokyo, Japan
| 
|-
| Win
| align=center| 7-6-4
| John Renken
| Submission (kimura)
| Shooto: 2/23 in Korakuen Hall
| 
| align=center| 2
| align=center| 3:09
| Tokyo, Japan
| 
|-
| Win
| align=center| 6-6-4
| Yuichi Nakanishi
| Decision (unanimous)
| Shooto: 1/24 in Korakuen Hall
| 
| align=center| 2
| align=center| 5:00
| Tokyo, Japan
| 
|-
| Win
| align=center| 5-6-4
| Jun Kitagawa
| TKO (cut)
| Shooto: Gig West 3
| 
| align=center| 1
| align=center| 3:23
| Osaka, Japan
| 
|-
| Draw
| align=center| 4-6-4
| Masato Nishiguchi
| Draw (unanimous)
| Shooto: Gig East 10
| 
| align=center| 2
| align=center| 5:00
| Tokyo, Japan
| 
|-
| Draw
| align=center| 4-6-3
| Marcelo Machado
| Draw (unanimous)
| Shooto: Treasure Hunt 4
| 
| align=center| 2
| align=center| 5:00
| Setagaya, Tokyo, Japan
| 
|-
| Win
| align=center| 4-6-2
| Nathan Schouteren
| Submission (armbar)
| Shooto Holland: Night of the Warriors
| 
| align=center| 1
| align=center| 1:27
| Deventer, Holland
| 
|-
| Loss
| align=center| 3-6-2
| Shiko Yamashita
| Decision (unanimous)
| Shooto: Gig East 3
| 
| align=center| 2
| align=center| 5:00
| Tokyo, Japan
| 
|-
| Draw
| align=center| 3-5-2
| Izuru Takeuchi
| Draw
| Shooto: Gateway to the Extremes
| 
| align=center| 2
| align=center| 5:00
| Setagaya, Tokyo, Japan
| 
|-
| Loss
| align=center| 3-5-1
| Jun Kitagawa
| Decision (unanimous)
| Shooto: Renaxis 3
| 
| align=center| 2
| align=center| 5:00
| Setagaya, Tokyo, Japan
| 
|-
| Loss
| align=center| 3-4-1
| Yuki Sasaki
| Submission (heel hook)
| Shooto: Shooter's Passion
| 
| align=center| 1
| align=center| 2:00
| Setagaya, Tokyo, Japan
| 
|-
| Loss
| align=center| 3-3-1
| Cyrille Diabate
| TKO
| GT: Golden Trophy 1999
| 
| align=center| 2
| align=center| 0:00
| France
| 
|-
| Win
| align=center| 3-2-1
| Nobuhiro Tsurumaki
| TKO (cut)
| Shooto: Shooter's Soul
| 
| align=center| 1
| align=center| 0:54
| Setagaya, Tokyo, Japan
| 
|-
| Draw
| align=center| 2-2-1
| Izuru Takeuchi
| Draw (majority)
| Shooto: Las Grandes Viajes 6
| 
| align=center| 2
| align=center| 5:00
| Tokyo, Japan
| 
|-
| Win
| align=center| 2-2
| Masashi Kita
| TKO (punches)
| Shooto: Shooter's Dream
| 
| align=center| 1
| align=center| 3:00
| Setagaya, Tokyo, Japan
| 
|-
| Loss
| align=center| 1-2
| Masanori Suda
| Submission (armbar)
| Lumax Cup: Tournament of J '97 Heavyweight Tournament
| 
| align=center| 1
| align=center| 4:25
| Japan
| 
|-
| Loss
| align=center| 1-1
| Hiroyuki Yoshioka
| Submission (armbar)
| Lumax Cup: Tournament of J '96
| 
| align=center| 1
| align=center| 3:38
| Japan
| 
|-
| Win
| align=center| 1-0
| Katsuhisa Fujii
| Decision
| Lumax Cup: Tournament of J '96
| 
| align=center| 2
| align=center| 3:00
| Japan
|

See also
List of male mixed martial artists

References

External links
 

1971 births
Japanese male mixed martial artists
Middleweight mixed martial artists
Mixed martial artists utilizing shootfighting
Living people
Deep (mixed martial arts) champions